Robert Hall Elmore (January 2, 1913 – September 22, 1985) was an American composer, organist, pianist who was active in Philadelphia during the mid 20th century and who wrote some organ pieces that are included in recitals today.

Early life 
Robert Elmore was born on January 2, 1913, in Ramapuram, Chennai, India where his parents were missionaries. The  family relocated to Lincoln, Nebraska in 1918 where Elmore began studying piano at age six and organ at age nine. His first composition was written at age 11.

In 1925, the family relocated once again to Wayne, Pennsylvania where Elmore was to live at 130 Walnut Avenue until his death in 1985. Shortly thereafter he began study with famed organist and composer Pietro Yon who was then organist and music director at St. Patrick's Cathedral, New York. Yon was sufficiently impressed with Elmore's abilities to have referred to him as "the foremost American organist of the day".

Professional assignments 
While still in his teens Elmore was appointed organist at the Central Baptist Church, Wayne, Pennsylvania (1925–1933). He also performed as a theatre organist at the Lincoln, Bryn Mawr Seville and Anthony Wayne theaters. From 1938 to 1955 he was organist at the Holy Trinity Church in Philadelphia. In 1955 he was appointed organist of the Central Moravian Church in Bethlehem. The influence of classical, church and theatre music merged with his natural virtuosity and a sense of the  theatricality to create a uniquely personal compositional style.

References

External links
Official website

1913 births
1985 deaths
American classical organists
Theatre organists
20th-century organists
20th-century classical musicians